Streptoechites is a genus of flowering plants belonging to the family Apocynaceae.

Its native range is Hainan to Indo-China.

Species:
 Streptoechites chinensis (Merr.) D.J.Middleton & Livsh.

References

Apocynaceae
Apocynaceae genera